Kershaw–Ryan State Park is a public recreation area on Nevada State Route 317,  south of the town of Caliente, Nevada.

History

The canyon was settled in 1873 by Samuel and Hannah Kershaw, who operated a ranch called the Meadow Valley Wash Ranch. In 1904, they sold the property to rancher James Ryan, who donated the land to the state in 1926 to be a public park. The Civilian Conservation Corps developed visitor amenities in 1934, and Kershaw–Ryan State Park was officially established as one of Nevada's first four state parks the following year. A flash flood in 1984 destroyed most of the park's facilities, including the stone caretaker's cabin built by the CCC. After rebuilding and redesign, the park reopened in 1997. The trail system was expanded by 3.28 miles by the Great Basin Institute between August 2018 and late 2019.

Activities and amenities
The park offers camping, picnicking, and a group-use area. Hikers can explore the  Canyon Overlook Trail and shorter Rattlesnake Loop.

References

External links

Kershaw–Ryan State Park Nevada State Parks
Kershaw–Ryan State Park Trail Map Nevada State Parks

State parks of Nevada
Protected areas of Lincoln County, Nevada
Protected areas established in 1935
1935 establishments in Nevada
Civilian Conservation Corps in Nevada